Iron Horse Brewery is an independent craft brewery and brew pub operator in Ellensburg, Washington, USA. As of 2019, the brewery is the sixth largest producer of beer in Washington at 22,300 barrels.

Beers
The Iron Horse Brewery produces Quilter's Irish Death, a dark beer that has a beer rating of 87 (very good) from Beer Advocate.

Locations

Brewery 
Iron Horse Brewery operates in a 17,342 square foot production facility just outside the city limits of Ellensburg, WA.  The production facility is only available to visit through scheduled tours.  

The production facility space houses a 30bbl brewhouse, fermentation tanks, brite tanks, a centrifuge, a canning line, a bottling line, a kegging line, quality control testing equipment, and cold storage.  Iron Horse beer is shipped from that location to bars, restaurants, and grocery stores in Alaska, Idaho, Montana, Oregon, and Washington.  In 2020, Iron Horse started shipping beer directly to consumers.

Pub 
Iron Horse Brewery operates a brewpub with a patio in historic downtown Ellensburg, WA.  The 412 N Main St location is said to be the origin of the Great Ellensburg Fire. As of January 2021, the downtown Ellensburg location has closed. A new brewpub location in downtown Ellensburg is expected to open by Summer, 2021.

References

External links
 Iron Horse Brewery, company website
 Here's to Beer! Iron Horse Quilter's Irish Death: Seattlest, review of Quilter's Irish Death

Beer brewing companies based in Washington (state)
American beer brands